The 2022 United States House of Representatives elections in California were held on November 8, 2022, to elect representatives for the 52 seats in California (reduced from 53 in the redistricting cycle following the 2020 United States Census). This marked the first time in the state's history where it lost a seat.

This was the second election using congressional districts drawn by the California Citizens Redistricting Commission (after 2012 following the 2010 census). The commission submitted the final maps to the California Secretary of State on December 27, 2021. These new districts are considered "enacted" as of December 27, 2021. However, there was a 90-day period that ended on March 27, 2022, for any referendum petition to be filed to prevent the maps from becoming effective. Even after becoming effective, these newly redrawn districts did not become official until the 2022 primary and general elections, and the new districts will not actually exist until the 2023 inaugurations.

Of the fifty-three incumbents, six retired. All remaining incumbents were re-elected, and five new representatives were elected, two of which were from newly drawn districts.

Overview

Statewide

District
Results of the 2022 United States House of Representatives elections in California by district

District 1

Republican Doug LaMalfa, who has represented the district since 2013, was re-elected with 57.0% of the vote in 2020. LaMalfa is running for re-election.

Candidates

Advanced to general 
Doug LaMalfa (Republican), incumbent U.S. Representative
Max Steiner (Democratic), U.S. Foreign Service veteran

Eliminated in primary 
 Tim Geist (Republican), biopsychology researcher
 Rose Penelope Yee (No party preference), businesswoman

Endorsements

Predictions

Results

District 2

Democrat Jared Huffman, who has represented the district since 2013, was re-elected with 75.7% of the vote in 2020.

Candidates

Advanced to general 
Douglas Brower (Republican), chair of the Humboldt County Republican Party and former Ferndale city councilmember
Jared Huffman (Democratic), incumbent U.S. Representative

Eliminated in primary 
Chris Coulombe (Republican), businessman
Darian Elizondo (Republican), business owner
Beth Hampson (Democratic), educator
 Archimedes Ramirez (Republican), neurosurgeon

Endorsements

Predictions

Results

District 3

This seat is open after Democrat John Garamendi, who has represented the 3rd district since 2013, elected to run in the 8th district.

Candidates

Advanced to general 
Kermit Jones (Democratic), internal medicine physician, U.S. Navy veteran, and former White House Fellow
Kevin Kiley (Republican), state assemblyman and candidate for Governor of California in 2021

Eliminated in primary 
Scott Jones (Republican), Sacramento County Sheriff and runner-up for the 7th district in 2016
David Peterson (Democratic), technology professional and perennial candidate

Withdrew 
Tom McClintock (Republican), incumbent U.S. Representative (running in 5th district)

Endorsements

Predictions

Polling 

Scott Jones vs. Kevin Kiley

Results

District 4

The boundaries of the district were redrawn during the 2020 redistricting cycle and incumbent Tom McClintock opted to run in the 5th district. Democrat Mike Thompson, who has represented the 5th district since 2013, was re-elected with 76.1% of the vote in 2020.

Candidates

Advanced to general 
 Matt Brock (Republican), water utility supervisor
Mike Thompson (Democratic), incumbent U.S. Representative

Eliminated in primary 
 Scott Giblin (Republican), information services technician and runner-up for this district in 2020
Andrew Engdahl (Democratic), community organizer and business leader
 Jimih Jones (Republican), parts advisor
 Jason Kishineff (No party preference), homemaker

Endorsements

Predictions

Results

District 5

Due to redistricting, the incumbent changed from Democrat Mike Thompson to Republican Devin Nunes. Nunes initially ran for re-election, but resigned his seat on January 1, 2022, in order to become the CEO of Trump Media & Technology Group. After this, fellow Republican Tom McClintock switched to running in this district. McClintock, who has represented the 4th district since 2009, was re-elected with 55.9% of the vote in 2020.

Candidates

Advanced to general 
Michael J. Barkley (Democratic), lawyer
Tom McClintock (Republican), incumbent U.S. Representative

Eliminated in primary 
Nathan Magsig (Republican), Fresno County supervisor
David Main (Republican), emergency room physician
Kelsten Charles Obert (Republican), businessman
Steve Wozniak (No party preference), editor

Withdrew 
Phil Arballo (Democratic), financial advisor and runner-up for this district in 2020 (running in the 13th district)
Ricky Gill (Republican), former member of the U.S. National Security Council and the California State Board of Education and runner-up for the 9th district in 2012 (endorsed Tom McClintock)
Elizabeth Heng (Republican), tech entrepreneur and runner-up for the 16th district in 2020 (running in the 13th district)
Devin Nunes (Republican), former U.S. Representative (2013-2022) (endorsed Tom McClintock)

Declined 
Andreas Borgeas (Republican), state senator
Mike Boudreaux (Republican), Tulare County Sheriff (endorsed Magsig)
Steve Brandau (Republican), chair of the Fresno County Board of Supervisors
Luis Chavez (Democratic), president of the Fresno city council (running for reelection)
Jerry Dyer (Republican), mayor of Fresno
Shannon Grove (Republican), state senator from the 16th district and former Minority Leader of the California Senate
Melissa Hurtado (Democratic), state senator (running for re-election)
Andrew Janz (Democratic), Fresno County prosecutor, runner-up for this district in 2018, and candidate for mayor of Fresno in 2020
Devon Mathis (Republican), state assemblyman (running for reelection)
Margaret Mims (Republican), Fresno County Sheriff
Jim Patterson (Republican), state assemblyman (running for reelection, endorsed Magsig)
Lisa Smittcamp (Republican), Fresno County District Attorney
Paul Vander Poel III (Republican), Tulare County supervisor
Tim Ward (Republican), Tulare County District Attorney
Bob Whalen (Republican), Clovis city councillor

Endorsements

Predictions

Results

District 6

Due to redistricting, 6th district incumbent Ami Bera and 7th district incumbent Doris Matsui, both Democrats, swapped districts. Bera, who has represented the 7th district since 2013, was re-elected with 56.6% of the vote in 2020.

Candidates

Advanced to general 
Ami Bera (Democratic), incumbent U.S. Representative
Tamika Hamilton (Republican), pastor, U.S. Air Force veteran, and runner-up for CA-03 in 2020 (previously ran in 8th district)

Eliminated in primary 
Chris Bish (Republican), realtor and small business owner
Karla Black (Republican)
Bret Daniels (Republican), Citrus Heights city councillor
Mark Gorman (Democratic), retail worker
D. Keith Langford, Jr. (Republican)

Endorsements

Predictions

Results

District 7

Due to redistricting, 6th district incumbent Ami Bera and 7th district incumbent Doris Matsui, both Democrats, swapped districts. Matsui, who has represented the 6th district since 2013, was re-elected with 73.3% of the vote in 2020.

Candidates

Advanced to general 
Doris Matsui (Democratic), incumbent U.S. Representative
Max Semenenko (Republican), small business owner

Eliminated in primary 
Jimmy Fremgen (Democratic), former staffer for U.S. Representative Elijah Cummings

Withdrawn 
Mathew Ray Jedeikin (Democratic)

Endorsements

Predictions

Results

District 8

Due to redistricting, the incumbent changed from Republican Jay Obernolte to Democrat John Garamendi. Garamendi, who has represented the 3rd district since 2013, was re-elected with 54.7% of the vote in 2020. Garamendi is running for re-election.

Candidates

Advanced to general 
John Garamendi (Democratic), incumbent U.S. Representative
Rudy Recile (Republican), businessman and retired U.S. Army officer

Eliminated in primary 
Christopher Riley (Democratic), teacher
Edwin Rutsch (Democratic), community organizer
Cheryl Sudduth (Democratic), vice president of the West County Wastewater District board of directors

Disqualified 
Jason Paletta (Republican), police officer and U.S. Army veteran

Withdrew
Tamika Hamilton (Republican), pastor, U.S. Air Force veteran, and runner-up for CA-03 in 2020 (running in 6th district)

Endorsements

Predictions

Results

District 9 

Democrat Jerry McNerney, who has represented the district since 2013, was re-elected with 57.6% of the vote in 2020. McNerney decided to retire rather than seek re-election, and fellow Democrat Josh Harder then switched to run in this district.

Candidates

Advanced to general 
Josh Harder (Democratic), incumbent U.S. Representative
Tom Patti (Republican), chair of the San Joaquin County Board of Supervisors

Eliminated in primary 
Mark Andrews (no party preference), businessman
Harpreet Chima (Democratic), Union Organizer & Researcher
Karena Feng (Democratic), political consultant
Khalid Jafri (Democratic), engineer and farmer
Jonathan Madison (Republican), business owner and former staffer for U.S. Representative 
Jim Shoemaker (Republican), businessman

Declined 
Jerry McNerney (Democratic), incumbent U.S. Representative
José M. Hernández (Democratic), astronaut and candidate for the 10th district in 2012

Endorsements

General election

Predictions

Polling

Results

District 10

Due to redistricting, the incumbent changed from Democrat Josh Harder to fellow Democrat Mark DeSaulnier. DeSaulnier, who has represented the 11th district since 2015, was re-elected with 73.0% of the vote in 2020. DeSaulnier is running for re-election.

Candidates

Advanced to general 
Mark DeSaulnier (Democratic), incumbent U.S. Representative
Michael Ernest Kerr (Green), social justice advocate

Endorsements

General election

Predictions

Results

District 11 

Due to redistricting, the incumbent changed from Democrat Mark DeSaulnier to fellow Democrat Nancy Pelosi. Pelosi, who has represented the 12th district since 2013, was re-elected with 77.6% of the vote in 2020. Pelosi is running for re-election.

Candidates

Advanced to general 
John Dennis (Republican), businessman and perennial candidate
Nancy Pelosi (Democratic), incumbent U.S. Representative and Former Speaker of the House

Eliminated in primary 
Shahid Buttar, attorney, candidate for this district in 2018, and runner-up in 2020
Eve Del Castello, business consultant
Jeffrey Phillips (Democratic), progressive activist
Bianca von Krieg (Democratic), model and actress

Declined 
Joseph Roberts (Republican)

Endorsements

General election

Predictions

Results

District 12 

Due to redistricting, the incumbent changed from Democrat Nancy Pelosi to fellow Democrat Barbara Lee. Lee, who has represented the 13th district since 2013, was re-elected with 90.4% of the vote in 2020. Lee is running for re-election.

Candidates

Advanced to general 
Barbara Lee (Democratic), incumbent U.S. Representative
Stephen Slauson (Republican), electrical engineer

Eliminated in primary 
Glenn Kaplan (no party preference), small business owner
Ned Nuerge (Republican), retired driving instructor
Eric Wilson (Democratic), nonprofit organization employee

Endorsements

General election

Predictions

Results

District 13 

Due to redistricting, the incumbent changed from Democrat Barbara Lee to fellow Democrat Josh Harder. Harder, who has represented the 10th district since 2019, was re-elected with 55.2% of the vote in 2020. Harder is running for re-election in District 9, leaving this seat open. On December 2, the race was called for Duarte, leading with a margin of 584 raw votes.

Candidates

Advanced to general 
John Duarte (Republican), pistachio farmer and businessman
Adam Gray (Democratic), state assemblyman

Eliminated in primary 
Phil Arballo (Democratic), financial advisor and runner-up for California's 22nd congressional district in 2020
David Giglio (Republican), businessman
Diego Martinez (Republican), businessman and candidate for governor in the 2021 recall election

Withdrew 
Ricky Gill (Republican), former member of the U.S. National Security Council and the California State Board of Education and runner-up for the 9th district in 2012 (ran for the 5th district, then withdrew entirely)
Josh Harder (Democratic), incumbent U.S. Representative (running in the 9th district)
Simon Aslanpour (Republican), florist
Jolene Daly (Republican), psychologist
Jake Griffith (Republican), U.S. Army veteran
Sean Harrison (Republican), clinic patient advocate manager
Elizabeth Heng (Republican), tech entrepreneur and runner-up for the 16th district in 2018
Eugene Rubio Kilbride (Republican), attorney and U.S. Army veteran
Angelina Sigala (Democratic), teacher
Matt Stoll (Republican)
Michael Barkley (Democratic), attorney, U.S. Navy veteran, and perennial candidate

Declined 
Anna Caballero (Democratic), State Senator
Andrew Janz (Democratic), Fresno County prosecutor, runner-up for the 22nd district in 2018, and candidate for mayor of Fresno in 2020

Endorsements

General election

Debates and forums

Predictions

Polling 

Generic Democrat vs. generic Republican

Results

District 14 

Due to redistricting, 14th district incumbent Jackie Speier and 15th district incumbent Eric Swalwell, both Democrats, swapped districts. Swalwell, who has represented the 15th district since 2013, was re-elected with 70.9% of the vote in 2020.

Candidates

Advanced to general 
Alison Hayden (Republican), special education teacher and runner-up for this district in 2020
Eric Swalwell (Democratic), incumbent U.S. Representative

Eliminated in primary 
Sri "Steve" Iyer (Republican), international renewables executive
James Peters (Democrat), team builder and waiter
Liam Miguel Simard (No party preference)
Major Singh (No party preference)
Tom Wong (Republican), small business owner

Endorsements

General election

Predictions

Results

District 15 

Due to redistricting, 14th district incumbent Jackie Speier and 15th district incumbent Eric Swalwell, both Democrats, swapped districts. Jackie Speier, who has represented the 14th district since 2013, was re-elected with 79.3% of the vote in 2020. In November 2021, Speier announced that she would not seek reelection after her next term.

Candidates

Advanced to general 
David Canepa (Democratic), Member of the San Mateo County Board of Supervisors
Kevin Mullin (Democratic), Speaker pro tempore of the California State Assembly

Eliminated in primary 
Emily Beach (Democratic), Burlingame city councilmember and U.S. Army veteran
Jim Garety (No party preference), security safety manager
Gus Mattammal (Republican), math teacher
Ferenc Pataki (No party preference), realtor
Andrew Watters (Democratic), attorney

Declined 
Giselle Hale (Democratic), mayor of Redwood City (ran for state assembly)
Diane Papan (Democratic), San Mateo city councillor (ran for state assembly)
Jackie Speier (Democratic), incumbent U.S. Representative (endorsed Kevin Mullin)
Rick Bonilla (Unknown), San Mateo city councillor
Davina Hurt (Unknown), Belmont city councillor
Shelly Masur (Democratic), former Redwood City councillor
Gina Papan (Unknown), Millbrae city councillor
Adam Rak (Unknown), San Carlos city councillor
David Brandt (No party preference)
Josh Becker (Democratic), state senator

Endorsements

Primary election

Polling

General election

Predictions

Results

District 16 

Due to redistricting, the incumbent changed from Democrat Jim Costa to fellow Democrat Anna Eshoo. Eshoo, who has represented the 18th district since 2013, was re-elected with 63.2% of the vote in 2020.

Candidates

Advanced to general 
Anna Eshoo (Democratic), incumbent U.S. Representative
Rishi Kumar (Democratic), Saratoga city councillor and runner-up for this district in 2020

Eliminated in primary 
Richard Fox (Republican), attorney and physician
John Fredrich (No party preference), teacher
Ajwang Rading (Democratic), attorney
Peter Ohtaki (Republican), former mayor of Menlo Park
Benjamin Solomon (Republican), fintech startup owner
Greg Tanaka (Democratic), Palo Alto city councillor

Endorsements

General election

Predictions

Results

District 17 

Democrat Ro Khanna, who has represented the district since 2017, was re-elected with 71.3% of the vote in 2020. Khanna is running for re-election.

Candidates

Advanced to general
Ro Khanna (Democratic), incumbent U.S. Representative
Ritesh Tandon (Republican), researcher, entrepreneur, and CEO

Eliminated in primary 
Joe Dehn (Libertarian), square dance caller
Stephen Forbes (Democratic), accountant
Rao Ravul (Democratic), investor and businessman

Endorsements

General election

Predictions

Results

District 18 

Due to redistricting, the incumbent changed from Democrat Anna Eshoo to fellow Democrat Zoe Lofgren. Lofgren, who has represented the 19th district since 2013, was re-elected with 71.7% of the vote in 2020. Lofgren is running for re-election.

Candidates

Advanced to general 
Peter Hernandez (Republican), chair of the San Benito County Board of Supervisors
Zoe Lofgren (Democratic), incumbent U.S. Representative

Eliminated in primary 
Luis Acevedo-Arreguin (Democratic), U.S. Citizenship instructor

Endorsements

General election

Predictions

Results

District 19 

Due to redistricting, the incumbent changed from Democrat Zoe Lofgren to fellow Democrat Jimmy Panetta. Panetta, who has represented the 20th district since 2017, was re-elected with 76.8% of the vote in 2020.

Candidates

Advanced to general 
Jeff Gorman (Republican), small business owner
Jimmy Panetta (Democratic), incumbent U.S. Representative

Eliminated in primary 
Douglas Deitch (Democratic), water policy CEO
Dalila Epperson (Republican), community organizer and retired nurse

Endorsements

General election

Predictions

Results

District 20 

Due to redistricting, the incumbent changed from Democrat Jimmy Panetta to Republicans. Kevin McCarthy, who had represented the 23rd district since 2013, was elected with 62.1% of the vote in 2020. Conway, who was elected in a 2022 special election to replace Devin Nunes after his resignation to become CEO of Trump Media & Technology Group, declined to run for a full term.

Candidates

Advanced to general 
Kevin McCarthy (Republican), incumbent U.S. Representative and House Minority Leader
Marisa Wood (Democratic), teacher

Eliminated in primary 
James Davis (Republican), engineer, economist, and author
Ben Dewell (Democratic), photographer
James Macaulay (Republican), retired accountant

Withdrawn 
Bruno Amato (Democratic), actor and U.S. Navy veteran
Louis Gill (Democratic), former non-profit CEO

Declined 
Connie Conway (Republican), incumbent U.S. Representative (2022–present)

Endorsements

General election

Predictions

Results

District 21 

Due to redistricting, the incumbent changed from Republican David Valadao to Democrat Jim Costa, who has represented the 16th district since 2013, was re-elected with 59.4% of the vote in 2020. Costa is running for re-election.

Candidates

Advanced to general 
Jim Costa (Democratic), incumbent U.S. Representative
Michael Maher (Republican), aviation business owner

Eliminated in primary 
Eric Garcia (Democratic), therapist
Matt Stoll (Republican), small business owner

Withdrew 
Nathan Brown (Republican), attorney

Endorsements

General election

Predictions

Polling

Results

District 22 

Due to redistricting, the incumbent changed from Republican Connie Conway to fellow Republican David Valadao. Conway replaced Devin Nunes, who resigned in December 2021 to become CEO of Trump Media & Technology Group, in a 2022 special election. Conway declined to run for reelection. Valadao, who has represented the 21st district since 2021, was elected with 50.4% of the vote in 2020. Valadao is running for re-election.

Candidates

Advanced to general 
Rudy Salas (Democratic), state assemblyman
David Valadao (Republican), incumbent U.S. Representative

Eliminated in primary 
Chris Mathys (Republican), former Fresno city councillor
Adam Medeiros (Republican), Kings County Board of Education trustee

Withdrew 
Angel Lara (Democratic), former aide to U.S. Senator Dianne Feinstein
Nicole Parra (Democratic), former state assemblywoman (ran for state senate)
Bryan Osorio (Democratic), mayor of Delano (ran for state senate)

Declined 
TJ Cox (Democratic), former U.S. Representative (2019–2021) (endorsed Salas)

Endorsements

General election

Predictions

Polling

Results

District 23 

Due to redistricting, the incumbent changed from Republican Kevin McCarthy to fellow Republican Jay Obernolte. Obernolte, who has represented the 8th district since 2021, was elected with 56.1% of the vote in 2020.

Candidates

Advanced to general 
Derek Marshall (Democratic), community organizer
Jay Obernolte (Republican), incumbent U.S. Representative

Eliminated in primary 
Blanca Gomez (Democratic), Victorville city councillor

Endorsements

General election

Predictions

Results

District 24 

Democrat Salud Carbajal, who has represented the district since 2017, was re-elected with 58.7% of the vote in 2020. Carbajal is running for re-election.

Candidates

Advanced to general
Brad Allen (Republican)
Salud Carbajal (Democratic), incumbent U.S. Representative

Eliminated in primary 
Jeff Frankenfield (No party preference), global accounts manager
Michele R. Weslander Quaid (No party preference), entrepreneur, coach, and educator

Endorsements

General election

Predictions

Results

District 25 

Due to redistricting, the incumbent changed from Republican Mike Garcia to Democrat Raul Ruiz. Ruiz, who has represented the 36th district since 2013, was re-elected with 60.3% of the vote in 2020.

Candidates

Advanced to general 
Brian Hawkins (Republican), San Jacinto city councillor and pastor
Raul Ruiz (Democratic), incumbent U.S. Representative

Eliminated in primary 
James Gibson (Republican), bank vice president
Jonathan Reiss (Republican), multimedia consultant
Burt Thakur (Republican), engineering project manager
Ceci Truman (Republican), small business owner
Brian Tyson (Republican), physician and business owner

Declined 
Eduardo Garcia (Democratic), state assemblyman (running for re-election)

Endorsements

General election

Predictions

Results

District 26 

Democrat Julia Brownley, who has represented the district since 2013, was re-elected with 60.6% of the vote in 2020.

The boundaries of the district were redrawn during the 2020 redistricting cycle and became effective on March 27, 2022, for the 2022 primary and general elections.

Candidates

Advanced to general
Julia Brownley (Democratic), incumbent U.S. Representative
Matt Jacobs (Republican), attorney

Eliminated in primary 
Fadde Mikhail (Republican), professional sports agent
Paul Taylor (Republican), businessman
David Goodman (No party preference), businessman

Withdrew 
Daniel Wilson (No party preference), veteran (ran for state assembly)

Endorsements

Primary election

Polling

General election

Predictions

Polling 

Generic Democrat vs. generic Republican

Results

District 27 

Due to redistricting, the incumbent changed from Democrat Judy Chu to Republican Mike Garcia. Garcia, who has represented the 25th district since 2020, was re-elected with 50.05% of the vote in 2020.

Candidates

Advanced to general
Mike Garcia (Republican), incumbent U.S. Representative
Christy Smith (Democratic), former state assemblywoman and runner-up for this district in 2020

Eliminated in primary 
Ruth Luevanos (Democratic), Simi Valley city councillor
Mark Pierce (Republican), small business owner
Quaye Quartey (Democratic), retired U.S. Navy officer
David Rudnick (Republican), business owner, former U.S. Marine Corps Infantryman

Declined 
Steve Hill (Democratic), appraiser, comedian, and U.S. Marine Corps veteran
Chris Bellingham (Democratic), former combat medic and researcher
Rhoda Nazanin (Democratic), project manager
Dara Stransky (Democratic), business owner

Endorsements

Primary election

Polling

General election

Predictions

Polling 

Mike Garcia vs. Quaye Quartey

Results

District 28 

Due to redistricting, the incumbent changed from Democrat Adam Schiff to fellow Democrat Judy Chu. Chu, who has represented the 27th district since 2013, was re-elected with 69.8% of the vote in 2020.

Candidates

Advanced to general
Judy Chu (Democratic), incumbent U.S. Representative
Wes Hallman (Republican)

Eliminated in primary 
Dorothy Caronna (Democratic)
Gio DePaolis (No party preference), media consultant

Withdrew  
Daniel Bocic Martinez (Republican), attorney and talent scout
Ali Jordan (No party preference)
Johnny Nalbandian (Republican)
Fepbrina Estrelvia Keivaulqe Autiameineire (No party preference), community organizer
Crystal Prebola (Republican), podcast host

Endorsements

General election

Predictions

Results

District 29 

Democrat Tony Cárdenas, who has represented the district since 2013, was re-elected with 56.6% of the vote in 2020.

Candidates

Advanced to general 
Tony Cárdenas (Democratic), incumbent U.S. Representative
Angelica Dueñas (Democratic), former president of the Sun Valley neighborhood council, candidate for this district in 2018, and runner-up in 2020

Eliminated in primary 
Margarita Maria Carranza (Republican)
Rudy Melendez (Republican)
Andy Miranda (Republican)

Endorsements

General election

Predictions

Results

District 30 

Due to redistricting, the incumbent changed from Democrat Brad Sherman to fellow Democrat Adam Schiff. Schiff, who has represented the 28th district since 2013, was re-elected with 72.7% of the vote in 2020. Schiff is running for re-election.

Candidates

Advanced to general 
Maebe A. Girl (Democratic), Silver Lake neighborhood council board member, drag queen, and candidate for this district in 2020
Adam Schiff (Democratic), incumbent U.S. Representative

Eliminated in primary 
Sal Genovese (Republican), community services director
Patrick Gipson (Republican), former Los Angeles County deputy sheriff
Ronda Kennedy (Republican), attorney and runner-up for California's 26th congressional district in 2020
William "Gunner" Meurer (Green), business owner
Johnny Nalbandian (Republican), food industry businessman
Tony Rodriguez, construction recruiter
Paloma Zuniga (Republican), actress

Endorsements

General election

Predictions

Results

District 31 

Due to redistricting, the incumbent changed from Democrat Pete Aguilar to fellow Democrat Grace Napolitano. Napolitano, who has represented the 32nd district since 2013, was re-elected with 66.6% of the vote in 2020.

Candidates

Advanced to general
Grace Napolitano (Democratic), incumbent U.S. Representative
Daniel Bocic Martinez (Republican), attorney and high school teacher
Erskine Levi (No party preference) (write-in)

Eliminated in primary 
Rocco De Luca (Democratic), construction project manager

Endorsements

General election

Predictions

Results

District 32 

Due to redistricting, the incumbent changed from Democrat Grace Napolitano to fellow Democrat Brad Sherman. Sherman, who has represented the 30th district since 2013, was re-elected with 69.5% of the vote in 2020.

Candidates

Advanced to general 
Brad Sherman (Democratic), incumbent U.S. Representative
Lucie Volotzky (Republican), realtor

Eliminated in primary 
Shervin Aazami (Democratic), public health professional
Susan Murphy (Republican)
Jason Potell (Democratic), business consultant and dance instructor
Raji Rab (Democratic), pilot and perennial candidate
Aarika Rhodes (Democratic), elementary school teacher

Endorsements

General election

Predictions

Results

District 33 

Due to redistricting, the incumbent changed from Democrat Ted Lieu to fellow Democrat Pete Aguilar. Aguilar, who has represented the 31st district since 2015, was re-elected with 61.3% of the vote in 2020.

Candidates

Advanced to general 
Pete Aguilar (Democratic), incumbent U.S. Representative and Vice Chair of the House Democratic Caucus
John Mark Porter (Republican), disaster response coordinator

Eliminated in primary 
Rex Gutierrez (Republican), pastor and former Rancho Cucamonga city councillor
Ernest Richter (Republican), retired businessman

Endorsements

General election

Predictions

Results

District 34 

Democrat Jimmy Gomez, who has represented the district since 2017, was re-elected with 53.0% of the vote in 2020.

The boundaries of the district were redrawn during the 2020 redistricting cycle and became effective on March 27, 2022, for the 2022 primary and general elections.

Candidates

Advanced to general 
Jimmy Gomez (Democratic), incumbent U.S. Representative
David Kim (Democratic), MacArthur Park neighborhood council board member and runner-up for this district in 2020

Eliminated in primary 
Clifton VonBuck (Republican), small business owner

Endorsements

General election

Predictions

Results

District 35 

Democrat Norma Torres, who has represented the district since 2015, was re-elected with 69.3% of the vote in 2020.

The boundaries of the district were redrawn during the 2020 redistricting cycle and became effective on March 27, 2022, for the 2022 primary and general elections.

Candidates

Advanced to general 
Mike Cargile (Republican), independent filmmaker and runner-up for this district in 2020
Norma Torres (Democratic), incumbent U.S. Representative

Eliminated in primary 
Rafael Carcamo (Republican), physician and educator
Bob Erbst (Republican), educator
Lloyd Stevens (Democratic), systems analyst

Endorsements

General election

Predictions

Results

District 36 

Due to redistricting, the incumbent changed from Democrat Raul Ruiz to fellow Democrat Ted Lieu, who has represented the 33rd district since 2015, was re-elected with 67.6% of the vote in 2020.

Candidates

Advanced to general 
Joe Collins III (Republican), financial consultant, U.S. Navy veteran, and runner-up for the 43rd district in 2020
Ted Lieu (Democratic), incumbent U.S. Representative

Eliminated in primary 
Derrick Gates (Republican), pastor and mortgage broker
Ariana Hakami (Republican), financial advisor
Matthew Jesuele (No party preference), software engineer
Colin Obrien (Democratic), writer
Claire Ragge (Republican), bar owner
Steve Williams (No party preference), real estate broker

Endorsements

General election

Predictions

Results

District 37 

Democrat Karen Bass, who has represented the district since 2013, was re-elected with 85.9% of the vote in 2020. Bass announced that she would be retiring to run for mayor of Los Angeles.

Candidates

Advanced to general 
Sydney Kamlager (Democratic), State Senator
Jan Perry (Democratic), former Los Angeles City Councillor, candidate for mayor of Los Angeles in 2013, and candidate for district 2 of the Los Angeles County Board of Supervisors in 2020

Eliminated in primary 
Baltazar Fedalizo (Republican), businessman
Chris Champion (Republican), business owner
Daniel Lee (Democratic), Mayor of Culver City
Sandra Mendoza (Democratic), program manager and perennial candidate
Michael Shure (Democratic), NewsNation national correspondent

Withdrew 
Jamaal Gulledge (Democratic), University of California Los Angeles staffer (ran for state senate)

Declined 
Karen Bass (Democratic), incumbent U.S. Representative (running for mayor of Los Angeles, endorsed Kamlager)

Endorsements

Polling

General election

Predictions

Results

District 38 

Democrat Linda Sánchez, who has represented the district since 2013, was re-elected with 74.3% of the vote in 2020.

Candidates

Advanced to general 
Eric Ching (Republican), mayor of Walnut
Linda Sánchez (Democratic), incumbent U.S. Representative

Eliminated in primary 
John Sarega (Republican), pastor

Endorsements

General election

Predictions

Results

District 39 

Due to redistricting, the incumbent changed from Republican Young Kim to Democrat Mark Takano, who has represented the 41st district since 2013. Takano was re-elected with 64.0% of the vote in 2020.

Candidates

Advanced to general 
Aja Smith (Republican), small business owner and runner-up for this district in 2020
Mark Takano (Democratic), incumbent U.S. Representative

Eliminated in primary 
John Minnella (Republican), small business owner
Tony Moreno (Republican), businessman
Arthur Peterson (Republican), former member of the Wisconsin State Assembly (1951-1955) and the Montana House of Representatives (2000-2002)
Bill Spinney (Republican), retired businessman
Emmanuel Suarez (Republican), poolman and caretaker

Endorsements

General election

Predictions

Results

District 40 

Due to redistricting, the incumbent changed from Democrat Lucille Roybal-Allard to Republican Young Kim. Kim, who has represented the 39th district since 2021, was elected with 50.6% of the vote in 2020. Kim is running for re-election. The New York Times has reported that Mahmood aired ads undermining Kim by only mentioning her primary opponent Greg Raths, as part of a Democratic strategy to support further-right Republican primary candidates to make for an easier opponent in general elections in November.

Candidates

Declared

Advanced to general 
Young Kim (Republican), incumbent U.S. Representative
Asif Mahmood (Democratic), pulmonologist, member of the Medical Board of California, and candidate for California Insurance Commissioner in 2018

Eliminated in primary 
Greg Raths (Republican), Mission Viejo city councillor, former mayor of Mission Viejo, candidate for the 45th district in 2014 and 2016, and runner-up in 2020 
Nick Taurus (Republican), activist

Endorsements

General election

Predictions

Polling 

Generic Republican vs. generic Democrat

Results

District 41 

Due to redistricting, the incumbent changed from Democrat Mark Takano to Republican Ken Calvert. Calvert, who has represented the 42nd district since 2013, was re-elected with 57.1% of the vote in 2020.

Candidates

Advanced to general 
Ken Calvert (Republican), incumbent U.S. Representative
Will Rollins (Democratic), former federal prosecutor

Eliminated in primary 
Shrina Kurani (Democratic), engineer and entrepreneur
John Michael Lucio (Republican)
Anna Nevenic (No party preference)

Endorsements

General election

Predictions

Polling

Results

District 42 

Due to redistricting, the incumbent changed from Republican Ken Calvert to Democrats Lucille Roybal-Allard and Alan Lowenthal, whose districts were combined. Roybal-Allard, who has represented the 40th district since 2013, was re-elected with 72.7% of the vote in 2020. Lowenthal, who has represented the 47th district since 2013, was re-elected with 63.3% of the vote in 2020. Both Roybal-Allard and Lowenthal are retiring.

Candidates

Advanced to general 
John Briscoe (Republican), Ocean View School District trustee and runner-up for this district in 2018 and 2020
Robert Garcia (Democratic), mayor of Long Beach

Eliminated in primary 
Joaquín Beltrán (Democratic), engineer and community organizer
Julio Flores (Green), education administrator
Cristina Garcia (Democratic), state assemblywoman
Nicole López (Democratic), voter registration professional
Peter Mathews (Democratic), college professor and perennial candidate
William Summerville (Democratic), pastor

Withdrew 
William Griffith (No party preference)

Declined 
Lena Gonzalez (Democratic), state senator (endorsed Robert Garcia)
Alan Lowenthal (Democratic), incumbent U.S. Representative
Lucille Roybal-Allard (Democratic), incumbent U.S. Representative

Endorsements

General election

Predictions

Results

District 43 

Democrat Maxine Waters, who has represented the district since 2013, was re-elected with 71.7% of the vote in 2020.

Candidates

Advanced to general 
Omar Navarro (Republican), small business owner, and perennial candidate
Maxine Waters (Democratic), incumbent U.S. Representative

Eliminated in primary 
Jean Monestime (Democratic), laborer
Allison Pratt (Republican), youth advocate

Endorsements

General election

Predictions

Results

District 44 

Democrat Nanette Barragán, who has represented the district since 2017, was re-elected with 67.8% of the vote in 2020.

Candidates

Advanced to general 
Nanette Barragán (Democratic), incumbent U.S. Representative
Paul Jones (Republican), minister

Eliminated in primary 
Morris Griffin (Democratic), maintenance technician

Endorsements

General election

Predictions

Results

District 45 

Due to redistricting, the incumbent changed from Democrat Katie Porter to Republican Michelle Steel. Steel, who has represented the 48th district since 2021, was elected with 51.1% of the vote in 2020. Steel is running for re-election.

Candidates

Advanced to general 
Jay Chen (Democratic), president of the board of trustees at Mt. San Antonio College, U.S. Navy veteran, and runner-up for the 39th district in 2012
Michelle Steel (Republican), incumbent U.S. Representative

Eliminated in primary 
Long Pham (Republican), nuclear engineer

Endorsements

General election

Predictions

Results

District 46 

Democrat Lou Correa, who has represented the district since 2017, was re-elected with 68.8% of the vote in 2020.

Candidates

Advanced to general 
Lou Correa (Democratic), incumbent U.S. Representative
Christopher Gonzales (Republican), attorney

Eliminated in primary 
Mike Nguyen (Republican), broker
Michael Ortega (Democratic), engineer
Felix Rocha (Republican), retired federal agent
Ed Rushman (No party preference), IT project manager

Endorsements

General election

Predictions

Results

District 47 

Due to redistricting, the incumbent changed from Democrat Alan Lowenthal to fellow Democrat Katie Porter. Porter, who has represented the 45th district since 2019, was re-elected with 53.5% of the vote in 2020.

Candidates

Advanced to general 
Scott Baugh (Republican), former state assemblyman, former chair of the Orange County Republican Party, and candidate for the 48th district in 2018
Katie Porter (Democratic), incumbent U.S. Representative

Eliminated in primary 
Brian Burley (Republican), IT analyst and candidate for the 48th district in 2020
Amy Phan West (Republican), former member of the Orange County Parks Commission and perennial candidate
Errol Webber (Republican), filmmaker and runner-up for the 37th district in 2020

Withdrew 
Harley Rouda (Democratic), former U.S. Representative

Endorsements

General election

Predictions

Results

District 48 

Due to redistricting, the incumbent changed from Republican Michelle Steel to fellow Republican Darrell Issa, who has represented the 50th district since 2021, was elected with 54.0% of the vote in 2020.

Candidates

Advanced to general 
Stephen Houlahan (Democratic), registered nurse and former Santee city councillor
Darrell Issa (Republican), incumbent U.S. Representative and technology entrepreneur

Eliminated in primary 
Matthew G. Rascon (Democratic), community volunteer
Lucinda KWH Jahn (No Party Preference), entertainment industry technician

Withdrawn 
Mari Barosay (Democratic), urgent care nurse
Timothy Bilash (Democratic), physician
Joseph Rocha (Democratic), attorney and U.S. Marine Corps veteran (running for State Senate)

Endorsements

General election

Predictions

Results

District 49 

Democrat Mike Levin, who has represented the district since 2019, was re-elected with 53.1% of the vote in 2020. Levin is running for re-election.

Candidates

Advanced to general 
Mike Levin (Democratic), incumbent U.S. Representative
Brian Maryott (Republican), former mayor of San Juan Capistrano, candidate for this district in 2018, and runner-up in 2020

Eliminated in primary 
Lisa Bartlett (Republican), Orange County supervisor
Josiah O'Neil (Republican), sheriff's deputy
Christopher Rodriguez (Republican), Oceanside city councillor
Nadia Smalley (Democratic), private nurse
Renee Taylor (Republican), cybersecurity manager

Withdrew 
Anne Elizabeth (Republican), talk show host

Endorsements

Polling

General election

Predictions

Polling 

Generic Democrat vs. generic Republican

Results

District 50 

Due to redistricting, the incumbent changed from Republican Darrell Issa to Democrat Scott Peters. Peters, who has represented the 52nd district since 2013, was re-elected with 61.6% of the vote in 2020.

Candidates

Advanced to general 
Scott Peters (Democratic), incumbent U.S. Representative
Corey Gustafson (Republican), educator

Eliminated in primary 
David Chiddick (Republican), coffee shop owner and U.S. Navy veteran
Adam Schindler (No party preference), medical researcher and technical writer
Kylie Taitano (Democratic), software engineer & tech non-profit CEO

Endorsements

General election

Predictions

Results

District 51 

Due to redistricting, the incumbent changed from Democrat Juan Vargas to fellow Democrat Sara Jacobs. Jacobs, who has represented the 53rd district since 2021, was elected with 59.5% of the vote in 2020.

Candidates

Advanced to general 
Stan Caplan (Republican), small business owner
Sara Jacobs (Democratic), incumbent U.S. Representative

Eliminated in primary 
Jose Cortes (Peace and Freedom), customer service representative

Endorsements

General election

Predictions

Results

District 52 

Due to redistricting, the incumbent changed from Democrat Scott Peters to fellow Democrat Juan Vargas. Vargas, who has represented the 51st district since 2013, was re-elected with 68.3% of the vote in 2020.

Candidates

Advanced to general 
Tyler Geffeney (Republican), minister
Juan Vargas (Democratic), incumbent U.S. Representative

Eliminated in primary 
Joaquín Vázquez (Democratic), community organizer and candidate for the 53rd district in 2020

Endorsements

General election

Predictions

Results

Notes

Partisan clients

References

External links
 California Elections

2022
California
United States House of Representatives